The North American Open is an annual international professional squash tournament. Started in 1966, this tournament was one of the most prestigious professional events behind the British Open and the World Open.

The 2014 North American Open is looking to move to Washington D.C. and would use George Washington University as the tournament’s backdrop. The 2014 event looks to add a women’s draw to the historic event. Additionally it hopes to provide equal prize money for both men and women, becoming one of two major professional squash events to do so.

History 
The North American Open is a key tournament in the history of squash in the United States and was home to many of the sport’s watershed moments.

The 1967 final of the North American Open saw two brothers face off as Sam and Ralph Howe took the court. The match stretched into a five-game battle with the younger brother, Ralph, coming out on top, taking the last game 15-13.

American Victor Niederhoffer captured the classic 1975 final with his four-game victory over the six-time North American Open champions, Sharif Khan. Niederhoffer is the last amateur to have won the North American Open title.

In 1982, Canadian squash sensation Mike Desaulniers topped Sharif Khan in the final securing the North American Open title and the No. 1 ranking on the North American hardball tour, ending Khan’s unprecedented thirteen-year reign at No.1.

The quarterfinal of the 1985 North American Open is arguably one of the best squash matches ever played, as American Tom Page took on the legendary Jahangir Khan at New York City’s Town Hall. Page took an early 2-1 lead against the world’s best squash player, eventually going down in five games.

After switching to a softball format in 1995, the North American Open halted in 1996, ending a thirty-year run of annual play. The tournament was resumed again in 2006 in San Francisco, where it was hosted for two years. The North American Open was then held in Richmond, Virginia from 2009-2013.

Past Results

Men's finals (since 2004)

Men's champions (1966–1995)

See also 
 United States Open (squash)

References 

 
Squash in Virginia